The Stonybrook Estate Historic District is a historic district at 501-521 Indian Ave. and 75 Vaucluse Avenue in Middletown, Rhode Island.  It encompasses what was the largest and most elaborate summer estate built in Middletown, an outgrowth of the expansion of Newport's summer resort community into neighboring towns.  The late Gothic Revival main house, built in 1928, was designed by Horace Trumbauer (who also worked on The Elms) for Edward C. Knight, Jr., for whom he had also designed a house on Newport's Bellevue Avenue.  The district includes the estate's landscaped grounds, along with a carriage house, several guest cottages, a gate house, and a gardener's cottage (now 75 Vaucluse Avenue).

The district was listed on the National Register of Historic Places in 2009.

See also
National Register of Historic Places listings in Newport County, Rhode Island

References

Houses on the National Register of Historic Places in Rhode Island
Gothic Revival architecture in Rhode Island
Houses completed in 1928
Middletown, Rhode Island
Historic districts in Newport County, Rhode Island
Houses in Newport County, Rhode Island
Historic districts on the National Register of Historic Places in Rhode Island
National Register of Historic Places in Newport County, Rhode Island